Eren is a Turkish name  which in today's Turkish has the meaning of "Saint".

Given name
 Ali Eren Beşerler (born 1975), Turkish footballer
 Ali Eren Demirezen (born 1990), Turkish amateur boxer
 Ali Eren İyican (born 1999), Turkish footballer
 Eren Albayrak (born 1991), Turkish footballer
 Eren Aydın (born 1982), Turkish footballer
 Eren Beyaz (born 1985), Turkish basketball player
 Eren Bilen (born 2000), Turkish footballer
 Eren Bülbül (2002–2017), Turkish murder victim
 Eren Derdiyok (born 1988), Swiss footballer
 Eren Dinkçi (born 2001), German-Turkish footballer
 Eren Erdem (born 1986), Turkish politician
 Eren Eyüboğlu (1913–1988), Turkish artist
 Eren Güngör (born 1988), Turkish footballer
 Eren Keles (born 1994), Austrian-Turkish footballer
 Eren Kinali (born 2000), English footballer
 Eren Keskin (born 1959), Turkish human rights activist
 Eren Özen (born 1983), Turkish footballer
 Eren Ozker (1948–1993), American puppeteer
 Eren Ozmen (born ), Turkish-American businesswoman
 Eren Şen (born 1984), German-Turkish footballer
 Eren Taşkin (born 1992), German footballer
 Eren Tozlu (born 1990), Turkish footballer
 Evren Eren Elmalı (born 2000), Turkish footballer
 Muhammed Eren Kıryolcu (born 2003), Turkish footballer

Fictional characters
 Eren Yeager, a character in the manga series Attack on Titan all seasons (Shingeki no Kyojin)

Surname
 Ali Eren Balıkel (born 1979), Turkish restaurateur
 Efkan Eren (born 1989), Turkish basketball player
 Emrah Eren (born 1978), Turkish footballer
 Erdal Eren (1964–1980), Turkish execution victim
 Hasan Eren (1919–2007), Turkish linguist
 Hasibe Eren (born 1975), Turkish actress
 İbrahim Eren (born 1980), Turkish bureaucrat
 John Eren (born 1964), Australian politician
 Mehmet Eren Boyraz (born 1981), Turkish footballer
 Semra Eren-Nijhar (born 1967), German-Turkish writer
 Tayfun Eren (born 1959), Australian politician
 Halil İbrahim Eren (born 1956), Turkish footballer

References

Turkish-language surnames
Turkish masculine given names